Park O. Davidson was a Canadian psychologist.

Career
Davidson graduated from the University of Alberta with a bachelor's and master's degree. He then proceeded to Queen's University at Kingston where he obtained a PhD. He returned to Alberta where he worked with the Alberta Guidance Clinic.

He was appointed to the University of Calgary where he was rapidly promoted to full Professor of Psychology. He then moved to the University of British Columbia where he developed a graduate programme in Clinical/Community Psychology.

He was a pioneer in the development of community mental health services.

On December 21, 1980, he and his wife, Sheena, were killed in a head-on collision on the Trans-Canada Highway in southern British Columbia.

He was active in regional and national associations of psychology.

Heritage
The British Columbia Psychological Association named the annual Practice of Psychology Award in memory of Park O. Davidson. This Award recognizes significant and distinguished contributions to the practice of the profession of psychology in British Columbia.

Positions
 President, Psychological Association of Alberta
 Chair, Canadian Advisory Council of Provincial Associations of Psychology 
 President, Canadian Psychological Association (1976)

Publications
 Bobey, M.J., & Davidson, P.O. (1970). Psychological factors affecting pain tolerance. Journal of Psychosomatic Research, 14(4), 371–376.
 Davidson, P.O., & Davidson, S.M. (eds). (1980). Behavioral Medicine: Changing health lifestyles. New York: Brunner/Mazel.

References

1937 births
1980 deaths
Canadian psychologists
20th-century Canadian psychologists
University of Alberta alumni
Queen's University at Kingston alumni
Academic staff of the University of British Columbia
Academic staff of the University of Calgary
Presidents of the Canadian Psychological Association